Crow River is an unincorporated community in Union Grove Township, Meeker County, Minnesota, United States, near Grove City. The community is located along 520th Avenue near 343rd Street.  Meeker County Roads 3 and 25 are also in the immediate area. The Middle Fork of the Crow River flows nearby.

At one time, Crow River included a post office, blacksmith, creamery, feed mill, garage, and the Crow River Store which was in operation from 1902 to 1965.

References

Unincorporated communities in Minnesota
Unincorporated communities in Meeker County, Minnesota